UBD may refer to:
 UBD, a gene which codes for the human protein Ubiquitin D
 United Baltic Duchy
 Use by date
 Universal Publishers (Australia)
 University of Brunei Darussalam, a university in Brunei